Długopole Górne (German:Oberlangenau) is a village in the administrative district of Gmina Międzylesie, within Kłodzko County, Lower Silesian Voivodeship, in south-western Poland.

References

Villages in Kłodzko County